Goodenia drummondii  is a species of flowering plant in the family Goodeniaceae and is endemic to the south-west of Western Australia. It is an erect shrub with linear to lance-shaped stem leaves, and spike-like thyrses of small white flowers with purplish spots.

Description

Taxonomy and naming
Goodenia drummondii was first formally described in 1990 by Roger Charles Carolin in the journal Telopea from material collected by James Drummond.

In 1998, Leigh William Sage described two subspecies of G. drummondii in the journal Nuytsia, and the names are accepted by the Australian Plant Census:

The specific epithet (drummondii) honours James Drummond and the epithet megaphylla means "large-leaved".

Distribution and habitat
This goodenia grows in woodland and heath on sandy soils from Kalbarri National Park to Latham in the south-west of Western Australia, but subspecies megaphylla mostly grows near granite outcrops and is restricted to an area between Armadale, Boyagin and Northam.

Conservation status
Goodenia drummondii and both its subspecies are classified as "not threatened" by the Government of Western Australia Department of Parks and Wildlife.

References

drummondii
Eudicots of Western Australia
Plants described in 1990
Taxa named by Roger Charles Carolin
Endemic flora of Western Australia